The 17th Pennsylvania House of Representatives District is located in western Pennsylvania and has been represented by Republican Timothy R. Bonner since 2023.

District profile
The 17th District is located in Butler County and Mercer County and includes the following areas:

Butler County

Allegheny Township
Bruin
Cherry Township
Cherry Valley
Concord Township
Eau Claire
Fairview
Fairview Township
Harrisville
Karns City
Marion Township
Mercer Township
Parker Township
Petrolia
Slippery Rock
Slippery Rock Township
Venango Township
Washington Township

Mercer County

Coolspring Township
Deer Creek Township
 Delaware Township
 East Lackawannock Township
Fairview Township
Findley Township
Fredonia
French Creek
Grove City
Jackson Center
Jackson Township
 Jefferson Township
Lake Township
Liberty Township
Mercer
Mill Creek Township
New Lebanon
New Vernon
 Otter Creek Township
Perry Township
Pine Township
 Salem Township
Sandy Creek Township
Sandy Lake
Sandy Lake Township
Sheakleyville
Springfield Township
Stoneboro
 Sugar Grove Township
 Wilmington Township
Wolf Creek Township
Worth Township

Representatives

Recent election results

References

External links
District map from the United States Census Bureau
Pennsylvania House Legislative District Maps from the Pennsylvania Redistricting Commission.  
Population Data for District 17 from the Pennsylvania Redistricting Commission.

Government of Crawford County, Pennsylvania
Government of Erie County, Pennsylvania
Government of Lawrence County, Pennsylvania
Government of Mercer County, Pennsylvania
17